The Kodak DCS 300 series comprised two cameras, the DCS 315 and DCS 330. They were professional-level digital SLR cameras built by Eastman Kodak's Kodak Professional Imaging Solutions division. They were based on the Nikon Pronea 6i APS SLR camera and were aimed at a lower price point than other models in the Kodak DCS range. The 1.5 megapixel DCS 315 was launched in 1998, while the 3 megapixel DCS 330 was launched in 1999.
The DCS 315 was the first digital SLR camera to incorporate an image preview LCD and inbuilt JPEG processing.

The two cameras had different sized CCD imaging chips, both of which were smaller than either 135 film or APS-C film frames.  The 315's imager had a crop factor of 2.6 relative to 135 film ("35mm"), while the 330's was larger with a factor of 1.9.

The Kodak modification to the Pronea 6i involved removing the camera's film back and mounting instead a Kodak digital back.  This not only covered the back of the camera, but also extended beneath it, approximately doubling the camera's height.  This was required to accommodate the large PC cards used as storage media, the six AA batteries required to power the camera, and the circuitry for image processing. The Kodak back had two display screens.  The upper was a full-color screen used for viewing taken shots.  The lower LCD displayed the camera's settings.

An infrared filter was mounted just behind the lens mount.  This had to be removed in order to fit certain Nikkor lenses, including the IX-Nikkor lenses designed for the APS format camera.

The DCS 315 was substantially faster than the 330 since only half as much data needed to be stored per shot.  The 315 also allowed image storage in the smaller JPEG format, while the 330 only allowed Kodak's proprietary .TIF RAW format.

See also
Kodak DCS

References

External links 
 DCS 315 at Kodak.com
 DCS 330 at Kodak.com
 Online manual at Kodak.com (PDF)
 DCS 300 series on mir.com.my photographic resource
 The DCS Story
 DCS315 Teardown photos on Flickr
 DCS315 video teardown on YouTube

Kodak DCS cameras